6346 may refer to:

 6346 (number), a number of verses in the Qu'ran
 6346 Syukumeguri, a minor planet
 ISO 6346, an international standard covering the coding
 The year in the 7th millennium